The discography of The Brian Jonestown Massacre (a San Francisco, CA based, neo-psychedelic band) consists of 20 studio albums, 14 EPs, five live albums, six compilation albums and 22 singles, as well as appearing on various artist releases and soundtracks. They have one rockumentary (Dig!) to their credit and a DVD release of their music videos titled Book of Days. Their music has been released by Bomp!, TVT and Tee Pee Records, among others.

Studio albums

EPs

Singles

Compilations

Videos

Live albums

Multiple-band compilations
The BJM have been featured on the following multiple-band compilations:

Pure Spun Sugar, Track 12 — "Good Morning Girl" (CD, American Pop Project & Candy Floss, CF-017, AmPop 201CD, 1998)
Delphonic Sounds Today!, Track 1 — "I Fought The Law (The Bobby Fuller Four)" (CD, DEL-FI Records, DFCD 2114, 1999)

In 1993 Bomp! and Tangible Records co-released a box set of six singles, each by a different San Francisco "psych" band. The bands were apparently handpicked by Anton Newcombe himself, and it is rumored that he also produced the music. Besides The Brian Jonestown Massacre, other bands featured included Orange, Nebtwister, and Hollowbody.

The other two singles (as credited to Acid and Reverb) are 4-track demos. Acid is by Newcombe and Travis Threlkel (who designed the box-cover and record sleeves), while Reverb is Threlkel and Geoffrey Bankowski, then a member of Hollowbody, currently recording as Good and Angry in New York City.

Tangible Singles Box
Hollowbody: Shelter Island/Tangled (TAN 1011/BMP 146)
Orange: Starwheel/Feijoa (TAN 1007/BMP 142)
Nebtwister: Come on Down/Greedy Venus (TAN 1009/BMP 144) 
Acid: Never, Ever/Thoughts of You (TAN 1010/BMP 145) 
The Brian Jonestown Massacre: Convertible/Enrique’s Dream (Their Satanic Majesty’s 2nd Request) (TAN 1008/BMP 143) 
Reverb: Aftertouch/Matins (TAN 1012/BMP 147)

References

Discographies of American artists
Rock music group discographies